Pycnobathra is a genus of moth in the family Gelechiidae. It was previously treated as a synonym of Megacraspedus.

Species
Pycnobathra achroa (Lower, 1901)
Pycnobathra acromelas (Turner, 1919)

Species mostly placed elsewhere
Pycnobathra aenictodes Turner, 1919
Pycnobathra aphileta Meyrick, 1904
Pycnobathra astemphella Meyrick, 1904
Pycnobathra centrosema Meyrick, 1904
Pycnobathra chalcoscia Meyrick, 1904
Pycnobathra clavata Meyrick, 1914
Pycnobathra coniodes Meyrick, 1904
Pycnobathra euxena Meyrick, 1904
Pycnobathra hoplitis Meyrick, 1904
Pycnobathra inficeta Meyrick, 1904
Pycnobathra ischnota Meyrick, 1904
Pycnobathra isotis Meyrick, 1904
Pycnobathra melitopis Meyrick, 1904
Pycnobathra niphodes (Lower, 1897)
Pycnobathra oxyphanes Meyrick, 1904
Pycnobathra pityritis Meyrick, 1904
Pycnobathra platyleuca Meyrick, 1904
Pycnobathra popularis Meyrick, 1904
Pycnobathra sclerotricha Meyrick, 1904
Pycnobathra sematacma Meyrick, 1921
Pycnobathra stratimera (Lower, 1897)

References

 
Anomologini